The indigo flycatcher (Eumyias indigo) is a species of bird in the Old World flycatcher family Muscicapidae.
It is found in Indonesia and Malaysia, where it is found in Sumatra, Java and northern montane areas of Borneo.
Its natural habitat is tropical moist submontane montane forests between 900m to 3000m, where it is a common to fairly common species.

References

indigo flycatcher
Birds of Indonesia
indigo flycatcher
Taxonomy articles created by Polbot